Donald Winslow  Fiske (August 27, 1916 – April 6, 2003) was an American psychologist.

Early life
Donald W. Fiske was born on August 27, 1916 in Lincoln, Nebraska. He grew up in Medford, Massachusetts. He graduated from Harvard University and in 1948, earned a PhD from the University of Michigan.

Career
Fiske was a professor of psychology at the University of Chicago.

Fiske specialized in methodological issues in personality, ability, and trait research. He was, with Donald T. Campbell, co-author of a paper regarding the multitrait-multimethod approach to evaluating construct validity.

Personal life and death
Fiske had a wife, Barbara Page, a son, Alan Fiske (who became a professor of anthropology at the University of California, Los Angeles), and a daughter, Susan Fiske (who became a professor of Psychology and Public Affairs at Princeton University). He resided in Hyde Park, Chicago, where he died on April 6, 2003.

References

1916 births
2003 deaths
People from Lincoln, Nebraska
Harvard University alumni
University of Michigan alumni
University of Chicago faculty
20th-century American psychologists
People from Medford, Massachusetts
Quantitative psychologists